Irene Siegel (née Irene Yarovich; born 1932) is an American artist and educator.

Early life and education
Her name was Irene Yarovich at birth, she was born in Chicago to Russian immigrant parents. She grew up on the south side of Chicago, in Gage Park. She was an only child. At age 11, she was awarded a scholarship to take classes at the School of the Art Institute of Chicago.

In 1953, Siegel graduated from Northwestern University, and she went on to study social science at the University of Chicago. Around that time, she became a Moholy-Nagy scholar at the Chicago Institute of Design (now IIT Institute of Design), where she earned her master's degree in 1956. She married Arthur Siegel in 1955, whom she had met at IIT.

Career
In 1967, Siegel was awarded a printmaking fellowship at Tamarind Institute. Her first solo art exhibition was in 1968 at the Lo Giudice Gallery in Chicago.

Siegel was a professor of art the University of Illinois at Chicago, from 1970 until 1982.

In 1985, a four panel fresco she had been commissioned at the Conrad Sulzer Regional Library in Chicago, led to a community controversy over its content. The fresco depicted scenes from Virgil's Aeneid; however the neighborhood was concerned her depiction, "implicitly endorsed graffiti", as well as other complaints.

Siegel's work is included in the collections of the Smithsonian American Art Museum, the Metropolitan Museum of Art, the Art Institute of Chicago, the  Norton Simon Museum, and the Museum of Modern Art, New York.

Her image is included in the iconic 1972 poster  Some Living American Women Artists by Mary Beth Edelson.

References

1932 births
School of the Art Institute of Chicago alumni
Northwestern University alumni
20th-century American women artists
Artists from Chicago
Artists in the Smithsonian American Art Museum collection
Living people